"Parking Lot Party" is song co-written and recorded by American country music artist Lee Brice. It was released in May 2013 as the fourth single from his 2012 album Hard 2 Love.  The song was written by Brice, Rhett Akins, Thomas Rhett and Luke Laird.

Content
The song is an up-tempo about a male partying with his friends before a concert.  The album version of the song contains an introduction from syndicated radio show hosts Big D and Bubba.

Critical reception
Billy Dukes of Taste of Country gave it 2.5 stars out of 5, saying that 'Parking Lot Party' is a good (but not great) party song, a subgenre that rarely gets top ratings anyway. Phony crowd effects only obfuscate a simple song, and this jam would be better without that addition." Giving it 4 out of 5 stars, Bobby Peacock of Roughstock said that " The production is loud, but in a rockin' kind of way that adds energy...and Brice's rough-edged vocal is full of charm."

Chart and certifications
The song has sold 519,000 copies in the US as of January 2014. As of January 15, 2014, "Parking Lot Party" is Brice's fourth consecutive single, and his fifth total, to be certified Gold or higher by the RIAA.

Year-end charts

Certifications

References

2013 singles
Lee Brice songs
Curb Records singles
Songs written by Rhett Akins
Songs written by Thomas Rhett
Songs written by Luke Laird
Songs written by Lee Brice
2012 songs